Igor Polyanski or Polyansky may refer to:

 Igor Polyansky (born 1967), Russian swimmer from Novosibirsk, now living in New Zealand
 Igor Andreyevich Polyanski (born 1990), Russian triathlete from Moscow